Qingzhou Wade–Giles: Tsing-chou, sometimes written as Ching-chow-fu, formerly Yidu County (Yitu), is a county-level city, which is located in the west of the prefecture-level city of Weifang, in the central part of Shandong Province, China. Qingzhou is a dynamic industry city, and also grows a great number of farm products. The local government holds an open policy of introduction of foreign capital, and has established strong business relationships with more than fifty countries and regions.

History

Qingzhou is named after one of the nine provinces that  appear in the Yu Gong geography chapter of the classic Book of Documents  composed during the Warring States period of Chinese history (403 BC － 221 BC). The history of this centuries old city dates back to ancient times twenty two centuries ago when it was part of the Dongyi area.

Administrative divisions
As 2012, this city is divided to 3 subdistricts and 9 towns.
Subdistricts
Wangfu Subdistrict
Yidu Subdistrict
Yunmenshan Subdistrict

Towns

Climate

Tourism 
Attractions

Fan Gongting an ancient pavilion built in Song Dynasty. It was a private garden of Fan Zhongyan who was the most notable poet and prosaist in an age of lively literature prosperous.
A Muslim district, including at least two large and historic mosques. The oldest one is the Zhenjiao Mosque. It dates back to 1302 and is one of the three most well-known mosques of the Yuan dynasty.
Ou Yuan, a Ming Dynasty garden. It turned to be a combination of park and zoo, and is used as a performance area for citizens in the dawn and nightfall.
Qingzhou Museum, featuring some of the Buddhist statues unearthed in 1996–7
Tuoshan ("Camel Mountain") and Yunmenshan ("Cloud Gate Mountain") a pair of mountains which include an ancient collection of Buddhist grottoes under national protection. (the coordinates of the peak are ).
Yang Tian, a natural park with marvelous surface features. It is covered by virgin forest, through which crystal rivers are flowing, and dotted with quantities of natural rock cavities. What makes this park more amazing is the so-called thousand Buddha's cave, which is considered as the first cave for the Buddhas. This is because of the huge volume of the cavern and the 1048 Buddhas in it that are in different postures and look extraordinarily vivid.

Timeline
412: The Chinese Buddhist pilgrim Faxian landed on the south of Shandong peninsula at Laoshan, and proceeded to Qingzhou to translate and edit the scriptures he had collected in India.
1986: The name "Qingzhou" is recovered from "Yi Du".
1996: The discovery of over 200 buried Buddhist statues at Qingzhou was hailed as a major archaeological find.  The statues included early examples of painted figures, and are thought to have been buried due to Emperor Huizong's Song Dynasty repression of Buddhism (he favoured Taoism).

References

 
Cities in Shandong
Weifang
County-level divisions of Shandong